NGC 6340 is an unbarred spiral galaxy in the constellation Draco. The galaxy is approximately 55 million light years away.

References

External links

Lenticular galaxies
Draco (constellation)
6340
10762
59742